Girida is a genus of moths in the family Geometridae.

Species
Girida rigida (Swinhoe, 1892)
Girida sporadica (Prout, 1932)

References

Moths described in 1892
Eupitheciini